Holger Andreas Gehrke (born 22 August 1960 in East Berlin) is a former professional German football player and manager.

Gehrke made 86 appearances in the Bundesliga for SpVgg Blau-Weiß 1890 Berlin, FC Schalke 04 and MSV Duisburg during his playing career.

In July 2012, Gehrke returned to Schalke, taking over as the club's new goalkeeping coach under Huub Stevens.

References

External links 
 

1960 births
Living people
Footballers from Berlin
German footballers
Association football goalkeepers
Bundesliga players
2. Bundesliga players
1. FC Saarbrücken players
FC Schalke 04 players
Tennis Borussia Berlin players
MSV Duisburg players
Karlsruher SC players
German football managers
2. Bundesliga managers
1. FC Köln managers